Alfred George Edwards (2 November 1848 – 22 July 1937), known as A. G. Edwards, was elected the first archbishop of the disestablished Church in Wales.

The son of a priest of the Church of England, Edwards was born in Llanymawddwy in Gwynedd. He studied at Jesus College, Oxford, before being appointed warden of Llandovery College in 1875. In the same year he was ordained as a priest and in 1885 he was appointed the vicar of St Peter's Church, Carmarthen.

In 1889, Edwards was appointed the Bishop of St Asaph: he was elected on 2 March at St Asaph Cathedral and consecrated a bishop on Lady Day 1889 (25 March), by Frederick Temple, Archbishop of Canterbury, at Westminster Abbey. He was a strong defender of the rights of the established Church of England in Wales in the face of mounting call for disestablishment from the nonconformist and liberal majority.

He was Honorary Chaplain to the Denbighshire Yeomanry from 2 August 1902.

When the Church of England in Wales was disestablished and became the Church in Wales in 1920, he was elected the first Archbishop of Wales. He retired in 1934, died in 1937 and was buried at St Asaph.

References

Archbishops of Wales
Bishops of St Asaph
Alumni of Jesus College, Oxford
People educated at Llandovery College
1848 births
1937 deaths
20th-century Anglican archbishops
Denbighshire Hussars officers
Wardens of Llandovery College
19th-century Welsh Anglican bishops